Harder is a surname. Notable people with the surname include:

Ashley Harder
Christopher Harder
Fred Harder
Elaine Harder (1947–2013), American politician
 (1891–1944), German SS-Hauptscharführer in Auschwitz concentration camp
George Harder
Hauke Harder
Heinrich Harder
Hieronymus Harder (1523–1607), German botanist
James Harder
Jan Harder
Josh Harder, American politician
Kelsie B. Harder
Lutz-Michael Harder (1942–2019), German opera tenor
Mel Harder
Olli Harder, New Zealand association football coach and former player
Pat Harder
Pernille Harder (disambiguation)
Rhea Harder
Robert Harder, American politician

See also
Haeder, surname
Hader (disambiguation)#People with the surname

Russian Mennonite surnames